The Admiral Pitka Recon Challenge is an annual international military exercise and competition, one of the longest and most difficult in the world, held every August since 2013 in Estonia (canceled in 2020 due to COVID-19 restrictions). It is named after the Estonian War of Independence hero Johan Pitka, and is now held in different locations throughout Estonia each year. It replaced the Erna Raid (Estonian: Erna retk) held from 1995 to 2011.

References

External links
 Admiral Pitka Recon Challenge — Official webpage
 Admiral Pitka Recon Challenge — Official webpage in English (Broken Link) 

Recurring events established in 2013
Military excellence competitions
Military of Estonia
Military skills competitions
Military sport in Estonia
Military education and training in Estonia